Olga Drobysheva (born 21 May 1984) is a female  road cyclist from Uzbekistan. She became Uzbekistani national road race and time trial champion in 2013 and also in both disciplines in 2014.

Major results
Sources:
2013
 National Road Championships
1st  Time Trial 
1st  Road Race 
2014
 National Road Championships
1st  Time Trial 
1st  Road Race

References

External links
 

1984 births
Uzbekistani female cyclists
Living people
Place of birth missing (living people)
21st-century Uzbekistani women